Kim Yun-ho or Kim Yoon-ho may refer to:

Kim Yun-ho (footballer), South Korean footballer
Shaun (musician), South Korean singer
Kim Yoon-ho (basketball), South Korean basketball player